Angelika Igorevna Timanina (born April 26, 1989, in Yekaterinburg) is a retired Russian competitor in synchronized swimming. Captain of the National Olympic team and a member of the city club of Moscow, she was an eight times winner of the World Championships, seven times winner of the European Championships. She won a gold medal in the women's team competition at the 2012 Summer Olympics, and announced her retirement on 1 July 2017 and working for Russian Football Union.

Career
She started synchronized swimming at five in the Secondary Children Youth School of Olympic Reserve "Trud" of synchronized swimming "Yunost Moskvy" No. 19 in Yekateriburg. After reaching a certain level, Timanina moved to Moscow, where she started to train in the Sport School of preparation of Olympic Reserve - "Trud."

At the FINA World Cup in 2008 she was part of the junior National Team that took part in the competition, Angelika performed in the duet event with Daria Korobova and captured bronze medals in the "free routine".

In 2009 Angelika made her senior debut in the World Cup held in Rome as a member of the Russian national team (with Anastasia Davydova, Natalia Ishchenko, Daria Korobova, Anna Nasekina, Alexandra Patskevich, Svetlana Romashina, Alla Shishkina) and won two gold medals in the team events (free routine and technical routine).

In 2010, at the European Aquatic Championship in Budapest, Russian competitors completed a grand slam performance, winning gold medals in team and figures.

In 2011 at the World Championships in Aquatics, held in Shanghai (China), Timanina became a three-time champion in the competition combo routine and groups.

In 2012, the Russian became the Olympic champion in the team competition.

Education
She is a student of the Institute of Physical Culture, Ural State Pedagogical University (USPU), Yekaterinburg.

Awards and titles
Honored Master of Sports of Russia.

References

External links 

 Official website

Living people
1989 births
Russian synchronized swimmers
Sportspeople from Yekaterinburg
Olympic gold medalists for Russia
Olympic synchronized swimmers of Russia
Synchronized swimmers at the 2012 Summer Olympics
Olympic medalists in synchronized swimming
Medalists at the 2012 Summer Olympics
World Aquatics Championships medalists in synchronised swimming
Synchronized swimmers at the 2015 World Aquatics Championships
Synchronized swimmers at the 2013 World Aquatics Championships
Synchronized swimmers at the 2011 World Aquatics Championships
Synchronized swimmers at the 2009 World Aquatics Championships
Universiade medalists in synchronized swimming
Universiade gold medalists for Russia
Medalists at the 2013 Summer Universiade